Chandler High School may refer to:
 Chandler High School (Victoria) in Keysborough, Victoria, Australia
 Chandler High School (Arizona) in Chandler, Arizona, USA
 Chandler High School (Oklahoma) in Chandler, Oklahoma, USA, listed on the NRHP in Oklahoma

See also
 Chandler School